Ereda is a village in Alutaguse Parish, Ida-Viru County in northeastern Estonia.

During the German occupation in World War II, a Nazi labor camp was situated there as a satellite camp of Vaivara concentration camp.

See also 
 Inge Sylten and Heinz Drosihn, an article about an inmate and commandant of the Ereda concentration camp in Estonia

References

Villages in Ida-Viru County
Kreis Wierland